Roy Campanella II (born June 20, 1948) is a television director and producer.

Biography
Born Roy Campanella II, he is the son of professional baseball great Roy Campanella. After directing some short films, the younger Campanella began directing episodic television.  One of his first professional assignments was directing an episode of the Lou Grant television series in 1982.  Within a few years he was also directing longer form television projects. He was also listed as a "creative consultant" in the credits of the sitcom 227.

By the late 1990s, he was also producing.  He entered into an arrangement with Black Entertainment Television (BET) to executive produce a series of feature-length adaptations of black romance novels (three of which he also directed).

In 2004, Campanella was named general manager of Pacifica radio station, KPFA in Berkeley, California. Campanella resigned 14 months later in the wake of reports that KPFA's 24-member Local Station Board (LSB) voted to terminate his employment. Tomas Moran, a former board member and KPFA supporter, speculated that Campanella was forced to resign because he rankled a fiercely entrenched bureaucracy that could not agree on the direction of the station.  The previous general manager, Gus Newport, a former mayor of Berkeley, served less than a year before he stepped down, citing personal reasons.

Selected credits

Directing

Movies of the Week (MOWs)

Episodic

Awards and recognition
 1992: DGA Award nomination
 1991: DGA Award

References

External links

Interview

1948 births
Living people
African-American film directors
African-American television directors
American television directors
American film directors
Directors Guild of America Award winners
21st-century African-American people
20th-century African-American people